Dr. José Miguel Miyar Barruecos (born 3 August 1932, in Siboney) is a Cuban politician and the Cuban Minister of Science, Technology and the Environment from 2009 to March 2012.

Biography
Dr. Miyar was a member in the Cuban Revolutionary Forces.  He is a medical doctor.  He was the Director of the Cuban Rural Medical Service. He was Secretary to the Council of State from 1980 to 2009. Dr. Miyar was a Deputy in the National Assembly of Popular Power and a Member of the Central Committee of the Communist Party of Cuba until 2013.

References

External links
Cubans wonder about military's growing role (Reuters)
Official Note from the Cuban Council of State (web.archive.org)

1932 births
Living people
Government ministers of Cuba
Communist Party of Cuba politicians